Syed Imad Wasim Haider (in Punjabi and ; born 18 December 1988), commonly known as Imad Wasim, is a Pakistani international cricketer. He is a left-handed all-rounder. 

In August 2018, he was one of thirty-three players to be awarded a central contract for the 2018–19 season by the Pakistan Cricket Board (PCB). In March 2019, he captained the Pakistan One Day International (ODI) team for the first time.

Early and personal life
Wasim was born in Swansea, Wales. His father briefly worked in the UK as an engineer. Wasim's parents moved to Pakistan when he was at a very early age, and he consequently played all first-class cricket there. He was studying medicine before his career in cricket, but quit when he got a chance to play for the under-19 Pakistan team.

In August 2019, Wasim married Sannia Ashfaq at the Shah Faisal Mosque in Islamabad.

International career
He made his Twenty20 International debut for Pakistan against Zimbabwe in Lahore on 24 May 2015. He made his One Day International debut for Pakistan against Sri Lanka on 19 July 2015. He was selected in the Pakistan squad for the 2016 ICC World Twenty20. Later in 2016, he became the 1st Pakistani spinner to take a 5-fer in T20Is as he recorded figures of 5/14 against the Windies. Wasim was a regular member of the winning Pakistan team in the 2017 ICC Champions Trophy. He also won Pakistan's T20I Player of the Year award in 2017 as he finished the year top of the ICC T20I bowling rankings.

In March 2019, Wasim was named in Pakistan's ODI squad for their series against Australia. Pakistan's captain Shoaib Malik was ruled out of the fourth ODI due to injury, with Wasim named as captain of the team in his place.

The following month, he was named in Pakistan's squad for the 2019 Cricket World Cup. He had a great tournament with both the ball and the bat as he scored 162 runs in 5 innings at an average of 54.00 and a healthy strike rate of 118.24 as well as chipping in with 2 wickets with an economy rate of 4.82 which was better than any Pakistani at the tournament.

, he is ranked third in the International Cricket Council's One Day International all-rounder rankings and seventh in the Twenty20 International bowling rankings.

In June 2020, he was named in a 29-man squad for Pakistan's tour to England during the COVID-19 pandemic. In September 2021, he was named in Pakistan's squad for the 2021 ICC Men's T20 World Cup.

Twenty20 franchise career
Imad Wasim is known as a T20 specialist, particularly for his "roo-like" skipping bowling action in the powerplay overs. He has played for sides in the Caribbean Premier League, Melbourne Renegades in Big Bash League, Bangladesh Premier League and Twenty20 Cup as well as captaining Karachi Kings in three Pakistan Super League seasons. In December 2021, he was signed by the Karachi Kings following the players' draft for the 2022 Pakistan Super League. In July 2022, he was signed by the Galle Gladiators for the third edition of the Lanka Premier League.

Television

References

External links

 

1988 births
Living people
Pakistani cricketers
Pakistan One Day International cricketers
Pakistan Twenty20 International cricketers
Pakistani cricket captains
Islamabad cricketers
Federal Areas cricketers
Karachi Kings cricketers
Jamaica Tallawahs cricketers
Barbados Royals cricketers
Nottinghamshire cricketers
Melbourne Renegades cricketers
Cricketers from Islamabad
Cricketers at the 2019 Cricket World Cup